Lawrance Aero Engine Company was an American aircraft engine manufacturer. Founded by engine pioneer Charles Lawrance, it designed one of the first successful air-cooled radial engines. It existed for only 5 years, being acquired by Wright Aeronautical, a much larger company better able to mass-produce Lawrance's radial engines.

History

The Lawrance Aero Engine Company was founded in 1917. After the end of World War I, the Lawrance engineers worked with both the Army and the Navy in developing their L-1 into a nine-cylinder radial engine, which became the 200 hp Lawrance J-1. It was the best American air-cooled engine at the time, and passed its 50-hour test in 1922.

The United States Navy was very enthusiastic about air-cooled radials, but was concerned that Lawrance couldn't produce enough engines for its needs.  The Navy suggested to Wright that it purchase the Lawrance company and build the J-1 itself. In May 1923, Lawrance was purchased by Wright Aeronautical, with the J-1 being further developed by Wright into the J-5, J-6, and R-795.

Products

References

Notes

Bibliography

External links
 Wright J-5 "Whirlwind" (PDF), by Kimble D. McCutcheon, from the Aircraft Engine Historical Society

Defunct aircraft engine manufacturers of the United States